Pammene luedersiana is a moth belonging to the family Tortricidae. The species was first described by Ludwig Friedrich Sorhagen in 1885.

It is native to Europe.

References

Grapholitini